(TVWV 21:9, Hamburg 1721) is a comic German-language opera in three acts by Georg Philipp Telemann to a libretto by .

The opera was Telemann's first full length purely comic opera, and was performed at the Oper am Gänsemarkt, while Reinhard Keiser was still running the opera.

The professional UK premiere was in 1974 by Kent Opera conducted by Roger Norrington, with April Cantelo, Thomas Lawlor and Linda Esther Gray among the cast.

Recordings
  – József Gregor, Éva Vámossy, Katalin Farkas, Éva Bártfai-Barta, Julia Paszthy, Guy de Mey, Paul Esswood, István Gáti, Capella Savaria Nicholas McGegan, Hungaroton 1987

References

German-language operas
1721 operas
Operas by Georg Philipp Telemann
Operas
Cultural depictions of Socrates
Opera world premieres at the Hamburg State Opera